Normal anion gap acidosis is an acidosis that is not accompanied by an abnormally increased anion gap.

The most common cause of normal anion gap acidosis is diarrhea with a renal tubular acidosis being a distant second.

Differential diagnosis
The differential diagnosis of normal anion gap acidosis is relatively short (when compared to the differential diagnosis of acidosis):
 Hyperalimentation (e.g. from TPN containing ammonium chloride)
 Chloride administration, often from normal saline
 Acetazolamide and other carbonic anhydrase inhibitors
 Renal tubular acidosis
 Diarrhea: due to a loss of bicarbonate. This is compensated by an increase in chloride concentration, thus leading to a normal anion gap, or hyperchloremic, metabolic acidosis. The pathophysiology of increased chloride concentration is the following: fluid secreted into the gut lumen contains higher amounts of Na+ than Cl−; large losses of these fluids, particularly if volume is replaced with fluids containing equal amounts of Na+ and Cl−, results in a decrease in the plasma Na+ concentration relative to the Cl−concentration. This scenario can be avoided if formulations such as lactated Ringer’s solution are used instead of normal saline to replace GI losses.
 Ureteroenteric fistula – an abnormal connection (fistula) between a ureter and the gastrointestinal tract
 Pancreaticoduodenal fistula – an abnormal connection between the pancreas and duodenum
 Spironolactone
 High ostomy output
 Hyperparathyroidism – can cause hyperchloremia and increase renal bicarbonate loss, which may result in a normal anion gap metabolic acidosis. Patients with hyperparathyroidism may have a lower than normal pH, slightly decreased PaCO2 due to respiratory compensation, a decreased bicarbonate level, and a normal anion gap.

As opposed to high anion gap acidosis (which involves increased organic acid production), normal anion gap acidosis involves either increased production/administration of chloride (hyperchloremic acidosis) or increased excretion of bicarbonate.

See also
 High anion gap metabolic acidosis

References

External links 

Nephrology